Gareth Johnson (born in Ballygalget, County Down) is an Irish sportsperson. He plays hurling with his local club Ballygalget and football for Loughinisland and has been a member of the Down senior inter-county hurling and football teams. Johnson scored an injury-time goal in the 2013 Christy Ring Cup final to win it for Down for the first time in a 3-16 to 2-17 victory against Kerry.

References

 McKernan welcomes 'Magic's' return. 11 May 2009.
 Christy Ring Cup: Down cruise into final. 7 June 2009.
 Down hurling stars named in football squad. 5 June 2007.

Honours
Down
Ulster Under-21 Hurling Championship (2): 2003, 2004
National Hurling League Division 2 (1): 2004
Christy Ring Cup (1): 2013
Club
Down Senior Hurling Championship (7): 1999, 2003, 2004, 2005, 2007, 2008, 2010
Ulster Senior Club Hurling Championship (1): 2005

Living people
Ballygalget hurlers
Down inter-county hurlers
Down inter-county Gaelic footballers
Dual players
Loughinisland Gaelic footballers
Ulster inter-provincial hurlers
Year of birth missing (living people)